The Battle of Cerro Muriano was a battle that took place during the Spanish Civil War in 1936. The battle is perhaps most known today for the famous photograph, The Falling Soldier, that Robert Capa took during it.

Location
Cerro Muriano is a village in Andalusia currently within the municipal terms of Córdoba and Obejo in the Province of Córdoba.

History
The battle followed the August Córdoba offensive and lasted two days, 5 and 6 September 1936. After a 36-hour siege the Regulares and the Spanish Legion troops overran the Republican positions of the Columna Miaja leaving many dead.

The battle is famous owing to the picture of a "falling militiaman" taken by Robert Capa, a picture that sought to represent the tragic fate of the Spanish Republic.

See also
The Falling Soldier controversy
List of Spanish Republican military equipment of the Spanish Civil War
List of Spanish Nationalist military equipment of the Spanish Civil War

References

Cerro Muriano
Cerro Muriano
1936 in Spain
Cerro Muriano
September 1936 events